In enzymology, a flavanone 3-dioxygenase is an enzyme that catalyzes the chemical reaction

a flavanone + 2-oxoglutarate + O2  a dihydroflavonol + succinate + CO2

The 3 substrates of this enzyme are flavanone, 2-oxoglutarate, and O2, whereas its 3 products are dihydroflavonol, succinate, and CO2.

This enzyme belongs to the family of oxidoreductases, specifically those acting on paired donors, with O2 as oxidant and incorporation or reduction of oxygen. The oxygen incorporated need not be derived from O2 with 2-oxoglutarate as one donor, and incorporation of one atom o oxygen into each donor.  The systematic name of this enzyme class is flavanone,2-oxoglutarate:oxygen oxidoreductase (3-hydroxylating). Other names in common use include naringenin 3-hydroxylase, flavanone 3-hydroxylase, flavanone 3beta-hydroxylase, flavanone synthase I, (2S)-flavanone 3-hydroxylase, and naringenin,2-oxoglutarate:oxygen oxidoreductase (3-hydroxylating).  This enzyme participates in flavonoid biosynthesis.  It has 2 cofactors: iron,  and Ascorbate.

References 

 
 

EC 1.14.11
Iron enzymes
Ascorbate enzymes
Enzymes of unknown structure
Flavanones metabolism